Beiyuan may refer to the following locations in China:

Area
Beiyuan, Chaoyang District, Beijing, an area in Chaoyang District, Beijing

Subdistricts
Beiyuan Subdistrict, Beijing, in Tongzhou District, Beijing
Beiyuan Subdistrict, Shijiazhuang, in Xinhua District, Shijiazhuang, Hebei
Beiyuan Subdistrict, Jinan (北园街道), in Tianqiao District, Jinan, Shandong
Beiyuan Subdistrict, Fuxin, in Xihe District, Fuxin, Liaoning
Beiyuan Subdistrict, Weifang, in Kuiwen District, Weifang, Shandong
Beiyuan Subdistrict, Yiwu, in Yiwu, Zhejiang

See also
Northern Yuan (1368–1635), or Bei Yuan, a Mongolian dynasty
Beiyuan station (disambiguation), multiple stations with Beiyuan in its name